This is a list of 175 species in the genus Ectopsocus.

Ectopsocus species

References